There are several rivers named Das Antas River or Rio das Antas in Brazil:

 Das Antas River (Bom River tributary)
 Das Antas River (Goiás)
 Das Antas River (Rio Grande do Sul)
 Das Antas River (Santa Catarina)
 Das Antas River (Tibagi River tributary)